Bernabe "Abe" Concepcion (born 1988) is a retired Filipino featherweight boxer. Concepcion resides in Rizal, Viga, Catanduanes, Philippines. Being from a boxing-oriented family, he trained from a young age. He turned professional at the age of 16.

Early life
Concepcion has two older brothers who were also professional boxers. They were his inspiration for having taken up boxing himself. He started boxing at an early age, watching his brothers at first and eventually training with them. He then went into amateur boxing but almost immediately turned professional when he turned 16.

Professional career

Oriental bantamweight 
He capture the vacant WBO Oriental super bantamweight title on July 31, 2015 at the 12,000-seater Cuneta Astrodome in Pasay, Philippines against Tanzanian boxer Juma Fundi.

Super bantamweight
Having developed his boxing skill in his early life, by 2005, he was considered to be one of the most promising boxing talents to emerge from the Philippines. Today, Concepcion fights mainly in the United States, carving out wins away from his homeland Philippines

He won his first title via KO in China against a Chinese hometown boxer, and gained his two recent belts in the United States against rated opposition. During this first professional bout, he gained his first knockdown, but was able to floor his veteran opponent as well in the early rounds of that fight (Concepcion was 17 years of age at the time).  A year later, he won the WBC youth super bantamweight title by scoring a unanimous decision win over a then undefeated opponent, Joksan "El Torito" Hernandez.

Bob Arum immediately signed Concepcion up for Top Rank Boxing following this win.

Featherweight 
For his first world title shot, Concepcion took on Steven Luevano for the WBO featherweight title on August 15, 2009. Originally, the fight was supposed to be included in the undercard of the May 2, 2009 bout between Manny Pacquiao and Ricky Hatton but Luevano pulled out due to an injury. Instead, Concepcion fought Colombian Yogli Herrera that night and managed to eke out a 6-round decision.

Concepcion lost his title bout against Steven Luevano via disqualification. Luevano was ahead on the scorecards when Concepcion landed late blows after the seventh round, resulting in a disqualification.

On February 13, 2010, Concepcion faced Puerto Rican Mario “Principe Ponceño” Santiago at the Las Vegas Hilton in Paradise, Nevada. The Filipino boxer won the 10-round bout by  unanimous decision with the scores 98-91, 96-93, 97-92. Concepcion was also able to knock the opponent down in the 6th-round with a powerful right. This win brought Concepcion to a potential fight against Puerto Rican sensation Juan Manuel López.

Bernabe Concepcion fought for the WBO featherweight championship again on July 10, 2010. This time, he took on Juan Manuel Lopez who won the belt from Luevano. In the opening round, Concepcion was floored by Lopez but rose back up to respond with a knockdown of his own. In the next round where the bout concluded, Concepcion was brought down by Lopez twice, prompting the referee to call a halt to the match. This was Concepcion's first defeat by stoppage. In response to the outcome of the match, Manny Pacquiao, who coached him in the days leading to the fight, blamed Concepcion for not taking his (Pacquiao's) advice.
Bernabe Concepcion is now going to fight Alejandro Perez 14-2-1 9KOs on the undercard to the showtime super fight between Juan Manuel Lopez vs. Rafael Marquez.

References

External links 
 
 Filipino boxer won vacant WBO Oriental bantamweight title from Rappler

1988 births
Featherweight boxers
Super-bantamweight boxers
Living people
Bicolano people
People from Catanduanes
Members of Iglesia ni Cristo
Filipino male boxers